() was an early form of professional theatre, originating from Italian theatre, that was popular throughout Europe between the 16th and 18th centuries. Characterized by masked "types",  was responsible for the rise of actresses such as Isabella Andreini and improvised performances based on sketches or scenarios. A , such as The Tooth Puller, is both scripted and improvised. Characters' entrances and exits are scripted.

The characters of the  usually represent fixed social types and stock characters, such as foolish old men, devious servants, or military officers full of false bravado. The characters are exaggerated "real characters", such as a know-it-all doctor called Il Dottore, a greedy old man called Pantalone, or a perfect relationship like the Innamorati. The form of theatre originated in Italy, but travelled throughout Europe - sometimes to as far away as Moscow.

In the Flaminio Scala scenario, for example, Il Magnifico persists and is interchangeable with Pantalone into the 17th century. While Calmo's characters (which also included the Spanish Capitano and a  type) were not masked, it is uncertain at what point the characters donned the mask. However, the connection to carnival (the period between Epiphany and Ash Wednesday) would suggest that masking was a convention of carnival and was applied at some point. The tradition in Northern Italy is centred in Florence, Mantua, and Venice, where the major companies came under the protection of the various dukes. Concomitantly, a Neapolitan tradition emerged in the south and featured the prominent stage figure Pulcinella, which has been long associated with Naples and derived into various types elsewhere—most famously as the puppet character Punch (of the eponymous Punch and Judy shows) in England.

History

Although  flourished in the Italian theatre during the Mannerist period, there has been a long-standing tradition of trying to establish historical antecedents in antiquity. Some date the origins to the period of the Roman Republic (Plautine types) or the Empire (Atellan Farces). The Atellan Farces of the Roman Empire featured crude "types" wearing masks with grossly exaggerated features and an improvised plot. Some historians argue that Atellan stock characters, Pappus, Maccus+Buccus, and Manducus, are the primitive versions of the  characters Pantalone, Pulcinella, and il Capitano. More recent accounts establish links to the medieval jongleurs, and prototypes from medieval moralities, such as Hellequin (as the source of Harlequin, for example).

This view may be somewhat romanticized since records describe the Gelosi performing Tasso's Aminta, for example, and much was done at court rather than in the street. By the mid-16th century, specific troupes of  performers began to coalesce, and by 1568 the Gelosi became a distinct company. In keeping with the tradition of the Italian Academies, I Gelosi adopted as their impress (or coat of arms) the two-faced Roman god Janus. Janus symbolized both the comings and goings of this travelling troupe and the dual nature of the actor who impersonates the "other." The Gelosi performed in Northern Italy and France where they received protection and patronage from the King of France. Flaminio Scala, who had been a minor performer in the Gelosi published the scenarios of the  around the start of the 17th century, really in an effort to legitimize the form—and ensure its legacy.

In , female roles were played by women, documented as early as the 1560s, making them the first known professional actresses in Europe since antiquity. Lucrezia Di Siena, whose name is on a contract of actors from 10 October 1564, has been referred to as the first Italian actress known by name, with Vincenza Armani and Barbara Flaminia as the first primadonnas and the first well-documented actresses in Italy (and Europe). By the end of the 1570s, Italian prelates attempted to ban female performers; however, by the end of the 16th century, actresses were standard on the Italian stage. The Italian scholar Ferdinando Taviani has collated a number of church documents opposing the advent of the actress as a kind of courtesan, whose scanty attire and promiscuous lifestyle corrupted young men, or at least infused them with carnal desires. Taviani's term  describes this and other practices offensive to the church, while giving us an idea of the phenomenon of the  performance.

By the early 17th century, the  comedies were moving from pure improvisational street performances to specified and clearly delineated acts and characters. Three books written during the 17th century— Fruti della moderne commedia (1628), Niccolò Barbieri's La supplica (1634) and Perrucci's Dell'arte rapresentativa (1699—"made firm recommendations concerning performing practice." Katritzky argues, that as a result,  was reduced to formulaic and stylized acting; as far as possible from the purity of the improvisational genesis a century earlier. In France, during the reign of Louis XIV, the Comédie-Italienne created a repertoire and delineated new masks and characters, while deleting some of the Italian precursors, such as Pantalone. French playwrights, particularly Molière, gleaned from the plots and masks in creating an indigenous treatment.

With the dispatch of the Italian comedians from France in 1697, the form transmogrified in the 18th century as genres such as  gained in attraction in France, particularly through the plays of Marivaux. Marivaux softened the  considerably by bringing in true emotion to the stage. Harlequin achieved more prominence during this period.

It is possible that this kind of improvised acting was passed down the Italian generations until the 17th century when it was revived as a professional theatrical technique. However, as currently used the term  was coined in the mid-18th century.

Curiously,  was equally if not more popular in France, where it continued its popularity throughout the 17th century (until 1697), and it was in France that  developed its established repertoire.  evolved into various configurations across Europe, and each country acculturated the form to its liking. The Punch and Judy puppet shows, popular to this day in England, owe their basis to the Pulcinella mask that emerged in Neapolitan versions of the form.

During the Napoleonic occupation of Italy, instigators of reform and critics of French Imperial rule (such as Giacomo Casanova) used the carnival masks to hide their identities while fueling political agendas, challenging social rule and hurling blatant insults and criticisms at the regime. In 1797, in order to destroy the impromptu style of carnival as a partisan platform, Napoleon outlawed the commedia dell'arte. It was not reborn in Venice until 1979 because of this.

Companies

, or companies, were troupes of actors, each of whom had a specific function or role. Actors were versed in a plethora of skills, with many having joined troupes without a theatre background. Some were doctors, others priests, others soldiers, enticed by the excitement and prevalence of theatre in Italian society. Actors were known to switch from troupe to troupe "on loan," and companies would often collaborate if unified by a single patron or performing in the same general location. Members would also splinter off to form their own troupes, such was the case with the Ganassa and the Gelosi. These  travelled throughout Europe from the early period, beginning with the Soldati, then, the Ganassa, who travelled to Spain, and were famous for playing the guitar and singing—never to be heard from again—and the famous troupes of the Golden Age (1580–1605): Gelosi, Confidenti, Accessi. These names which signified daring and enterprise were appropriated from the names of the academies—in a sense, to lend legitimacy. However, each troupe had its  (like a coat of arms) which symbolized its nature. The Gelosi, for example, used the two-headed face of the Roman god Janus, to signify its comings and goings and relationship to the season of Carnival, which took place in January. Janus also signified the duality of the actor, who is playing a character or mask, while still remaining oneself.

Magistrates and clergy were not always receptive to the travelling  (companies), particularly during periods of plague, and because of their itinerant nature. Actors, both male and female, were known to strip nearly naked, and storylines typically descended into crude situations with overt sexuality, considered to teach nothing but "lewdness and adultery...of both sexes" by the French Parliament. This was in reference to the nomadic nature of the troupes, often instigated by persecution from the Church, civil authorities, and rival theatre organisations that forced the companies to move from place to place.

A troupe often consisted of ten performers of familiar masked and unmasked types, and included women. The companies would employ carpenters, props masters, servants, nurses, and prompters, all of whom would travel with the company. They would travel in large carts laden with supplies necessary for their nomadic style of performance, enabling them to move from place to place without having to worry about the difficulties of relocation. This nomadic nature, though influenced by persecution, was also largely due in part to the troupes requiring new (and paying) audiences. They would take advantage of public fairs and celebrations, most often in wealthier towns where financial success was more probable. Companies would also find themselves summoned by high-ranking officials, who would offer patronage in return for performing in their land for a certain amount of time. Companies in fact preferred to not stay in any one place too long, mostly out of a fear of the act becoming "stale." They would move on to the next location while their popularity was still active, ensuring the towns and people were sad to see them leave, and would be more likely to either invite them back or pay to watch performances again should the troupe ever return. Prices were dependent on the troupe's decision, which could vary depending on the wealth of the location, the length of stay, and the regulations governments had in place for dramatic performances.

List of known  troupes
 Compagnia dei Fedeli: active 1601–1652, with Giambattista Andreini
 Compagnia degli Accesi: active 1590–1628
 : active 1578–1640
 Compagnia dei Confidenti: active 1574–1599; reformed under Flaminio Scala, operated again 1611–1639
 I Dedosi: active 1581–1599
 I Gelosi: active 1568–1604
 Signora Violante and Her Troupe of Dancers: active 1729–1732
 Zan Ganassa: active 1568–1610

Characters

Generally, the actors playing were diverse in background in terms of class and religion, and performed anywhere they could. Castagno posits that the aesthetic of exaggeration, distortion, anti-humanism (as in the masked types), and excessive borrowing as opposed to originality was typical of all the arts in the late Italian Renaissance. Theatre historian Martin Green points to the extravagance of emotion during the period of 's emergence as the reason for representational moods, or characters, that define the art. In , each character embodies a mood: mockery, sadness, gaiety, confusion, and so forth.

According to 18th-century London theatre critic Baretti,  incorporates specific roles and characters that were "originally intended as a kind of characteristic representative of some particular Italian district or town." (archetypes) The character's persona included the specific dialect of the region or town represented. Meaning that on stage, each character was performed in its own dialect. Characters would often be passed down from generation to generation, and characters married onstage were often married in real life as well, seen most famously with Francesco and Isabella Andreini. This was believed to make performances more natural, as well as strengthening the bonds within the troupe, who emphasized complete unity between every member. Additionally, each character has a singular costume and mask that is representative of the character's role.

 has four stock character groups:
 : servants, clowns; characters such as Arlecchino (also known as Harlequin), Brighella, Scapino, Pulcinella and Pedrolino
 : wealthy old men, masters; characters such as Pantalone and Il Dottore
 : young upper class lovers; who would have names such as Flavio and Isabella
 : self-styled captains, braggarts; can also be La Signora if a female

Masked characters are often referred to as "masks", which, according to John Rudlin, cannot be separated from the character. In other words, the characteristics of the character and the characteristics of the mask are the same. In time however, the word  came to refer to all of the characters of the  whether masked or not. Female characters (including female servants) are most often not masked (female  are never masked). The female character in the masters group is called Prima Donna and can be one of the lovers. There is also a female character known as The Courtisane who can also have a servant. Female servants wore bonnets. Their character was played with a malicious wit or gossipy gaiety. The  are often children of a male character in the masters group, but not of any female character in the masters group, which may represent younger women who have e.g. married an old man, or a high-class courtesan.

In the 17th century as  became popular in France, the characters of Pierrot, Columbina and Harlequin were refined and became essentially Parisian, according to Green.

Costumes

Each character in  has a distinct costume that helps the audience understand who the character is.

Arlecchino originally wore a tight fitting long jacket with matching trousers that both had numerous odd shaped patches, usually green, yellow, red, and brown. Usually, there was a bat and a wallet that would hang from his belt. His hat, which was a soft cap, was modeled after Charles IX or after Henri II, and almost always had a tail of a rabbit, hare or a fox with the occasional tuft of feathers. During the 17th century, the patches turned into blue, red, and green triangles arranged in a symmetrical pattern. The 18th century is when the iconic Arlecchino look with the diamond shaped lozenges took shape. The jacket became shorter and his hat changed from a soft cap to a double pointed hat.

Il Dottore's costume was a play on the academic dress of the Bolognese scholars. Il Dottore is almost always clothed entirely in black. He wore a long black gown or jacket that went below the knees. Over the gown, he would have a long black robe that went down to his heels, and he would have on black shoes, stockings, and breeches. In 1653, his costume was changed by Augustin Lolli who was a very popular Il Dottore actor. He added an enormous black hat, changed the robe to a jacket cut similarly to Louis XIV, and added a flat ruff to the neck.

Il Capitano's costume is similar to Il Dottore's in the fact that it is also a satire on military wear of the time. This costume would therefore change depending on where the Capitano character is from, and the period the Capitano is from.

Typically, he would wear a tight-fitting jacket with a matching pair of trousers.

The lovers, would wear what was considered to be the fashion of the time period. They would only wear plain half-masks with no character distinction or street makeup.

Subjects

Conventional plot lines were written on themes of sex, jealousy, love, and old age. Many of the basic plot elements can be traced back to the Roman comedies of Plautus and Terence, some of which were themselves translations of lost Greek comedies of the 4th century BC. However, it is more probable that the  used contemporary novella, or, traditional sources as well, and drew from current events and local news of the day. Not all  were comic, there were some mixed forms and even tragedies.

 performed written comedies at court. Audiences came to see the performers, with plotlines becoming secondary to the performance. Among the great , Isabella Andreini was perhaps the most widely known, and a medallion dedicated to her reads "eternal fame". Tristano Martinelli achieved international fame as the first of the great Arlecchinos, and was honoured by the Medici and the Queen of France.

Since the productions were improvised, dialogue and action could easily be changed to satirize local scandals, current events, or regional tastes, while still using old jokes and punchlines. Characters were identified by costumes, masks, and props, such as a type of baton known as a slapstick. These characters included the forebears of the modern clown, namely Harlequin and the zanni. Harlequin, in particular, was allowed to comment on current events in his entertainment.

There are countless variations on this story, as well as many that diverge wholly from the structure, such as a well-known story about Arlecchino becoming mysteriously pregnant, or the Punch and Judy scenario.

While generally personally unscripted, the performances often were based on scenarios that gave some semblance of a plot to the largely improvised format. The Flaminio Scala scenarios, published in the early 17th century, are the most widely known collection and representative of its most esteemed , I Gelosi.

Influence in visual art

The iconography of the  represents an entire field of study that has been examined by  scholars such as Erenstein, Castagno, Katritzky, Molinari, and others. In the early period, representative works by painters at Fontainebleau were notable for their erotic depictions of the thinly veiled , or the bare-breasted courtesan/actress.

The Flemish influence is widely documented as  figures entered the world of the  genre, depicting the dangers of lust, drinking, and the hedonistic lifestyle. Castagno describes the Flemish  (wandering painters) who assimilated themselves within Italian workshops and even assumed Italian surnames: one of the most influential painters, Lodewyk Toeput, for example, became Ludovico Pozzoserrato and was a celebrated painter in the Veneto region of Italy. The  can be attributed with establishing  as a genre of painting that would persist for centuries.

While the iconography gives evidence of the performance style (see Fossard collection), it is important to note that many of the images and engravings were not depictions from real life, but concocted in the studio. The Callot etchings of the Balli di Sfessania (1611) are most widely considered  rather than actual depictions of a  dance form, or typical masks. While these are often reproduced in large formats, it is important to note that the actual prints measured about 2×3 inches. In the 18th century, Watteau's painting of  figures intermingling with the aristocracy were often set in sumptuous garden or pastoral settings and were representative of that genre.

Pablo Picasso's 1921 painting Three Musicians is a colorful representation of -inspired characters. Picasso also designed the original costumes for Stravinsky's Pulcinella (1920), a ballet depicting  characters and situations.  iconography is evident in porcelain figurines many selling for thousands of dollars at auction.

Influence in performance art

The expressive theatre influenced Molière's comedy and subsequently , thus lending a fresh range of expression and choreographic means. An example of a  character in literature is the Pied Piper of Hamelin who is dressed as Harlequin.

Music and dance were central to  performance, and most performances had both instrumental and vocal music in them. Brighella was often depicted with a guitar, and many images of the  feature singing  or dancing figures. In fact, it was considered part of the  function to be able to sing and have the popular repertoire under their belt. The  probably accompanied the troupes and may have been in addition to the general cast of characters. For examples of strange instruments of various grotesque formations, see articles by Tom Heck, who has documented this area.

Prominent examples include The Tempest by William Shakespeare, Les Fourberies de Scapin by Molière, Servant of Two Masters (1743) by Carlo Goldoni, the Figaro plays of Pierre Beaumarchais, and especially Love for Three Oranges, Turandot and other  by Carlo Gozzi. Influences appear in the lodgers in Steven Berkoff's adaptation of Franz Kafka's The Metamorphosis.

Through their association with spoken theatre and playwrights  figures have provided opera with many of its stock characters. Mozart's Don Giovanni sets a puppet show story and comic servants like Leporello and Figaro have  precedents. Soubrette characters like Susanna in Le nozze di Figaro, Zerlina in Don Giovanni and Despina in Così fan tutte recall Columbina and related characters. The comic operas of Gaetano Donizetti, such as Elisir d'amore, draw readily upon  stock types. Leoncavallo's tragic melodrama Pagliacci depicts a  company in which the performers find their life situations reflecting events they depict on stage.  characters also figure in Richard Strauss's opera Ariadne auf Naxos.

Stock characters and situations also appear in ballet. Igor Stravinsky's Petrushka and Pulcinella allude directly to the tradition.

 is performed seasonally in Denmark on the Peacock Stage of Tivoli Gardens in Copenhagen, and north of Copenhagen at Dyrehavsbakken. Tivoli has regular performances, while Bakken has daily performances for children by Pierrot and a puppet version of Pulcinella resembling Punch and Judy.

See also

Notes

References

Sources
 
 
 
 
 
 Rudlin, John. Commedia dell'arte: An Actor's Handbook. Ebook Corporation.

Further reading
 Aguirre, Mariano 'Qué es la Commedia dell'arte' (Spanish) 
 
 Callery, Dymphna. Through the Body: A Practical Guide to Physical Theatre. London: Nickalis Hernt Books (2001). 
  (1628) Frutti delle moderne comedie et avvisi a chi le recita, Padua: Guareschi
 Perrucci, Andrea (1699) Dell'arte rappresentativa premeditata, ed all'improviso
 Scala, Flaminio (1611) Il Teatro Delle Favole Rappresentative (online pdf available at Bavarian State Library website). Translated into English by Henry F. Salerno in 1967 as Scenarios of the Commedia dell'arte. New Italian edition cured by F.Mariotti (1976). New partial translation (30 scenarios out of 50) by Richard Andrews (2008) The Commedia dell'arte of Flaminio Scala, A Translation and Analysis of Scenarios Published by: Scarecrow Press.
 Darius, Adam. The Commedia dell'arte (1996) Kolesnik Production OY, Helsinki. 
 DelPiano, Roberto La Commedia dell'arte 2007. Retrieved 2009-07-09.
 Grantham, Barry Playing Commedia, Nick Hern Books, London, 2000. 
 Grantham, Barry Commedia Plays: Scenarios – Scripts – Lazzi, Nick Hern Books, London, 2006. 
 
 
 Puppa, Paolo A History of Italian Theatre. Eds. Joseph Farrell. Cambridge University Press. 2006. 
 
 
 Taviani, Ferdinando and Marotti, Ferruccio, and Romei, Giovanna. La Commedia dell'arte e la societa barocca M. Bulzoni, Roma : 1969
 Taviani, Ferdinando and M. Schino (1982) Il segreto della commedia dell'arte.
 Tessari, R. (1969) La commedia dell'arte nel seicento
 Tessari, R. (1981) Commedia dell'arte: la maschera e l'ombra Tony, Kishawi Teaching Commedia dell'arte (2010) A step by step handbook for the theatre ensemble and Drama teacher.  
 Simply Masquerade – types of masks used

External links

  commedia-dell-arte.com – Judith Chaffee's Commedia website, with resources, annotated bibliography, and links
 Meagher, Jennifer (2007) Commedia dell'arte, Metropolitan Museum of Art, July 2007
 Bellinger, Martha Fletcher (2002) "The Commedia dell'arte", A Short History of the Drama'' (1927)
 Wilson, Matthew R. (2010) A History of Commedia dell'Arte

 
History of theatre